60 Sagittarii is a suspected binary star system in the southern constellation of Sagittarius. It has the Bayer designation A Sagittarii, while 60 Sagittarii is the Flamsteed designation. This naked-eye object forms the northwest corner of the asterism called the Terebellum and, with an apparent magnitude of approximately 4.84, it is the dimmest of the four stars in the Terebellum. It is located 379 light-years from the Sun, based on parallax, but is moving closer with a radial velocity of −51 km/s.

The visible component is an aging G-type giant star with a stellar classification of G6 III, having exhausted the supply of hydrogen at its core and expanded to 17 the Sun's radius. It is a red clump giant, indicating it is on the horizontal branch and is generating energy through the fusion of helium at its core. The star is radiating 170 times the luminosity of the Sun from its enlarged photosphere at an effective temperature of 4,997 K.

References

G-type giants
Horizontal-branch stars
Barium stars

Sagittarius (constellation)
Sagittarii, A
CD-26 14682
Sagittarii, 60
189005
098353
7618